Marcel Richard Mayack II (born 17 November 1990) is a Cameroonian male track and field athlete who competes in the triple jump.

Born in Ebolowa, he studied science and animation technology at Cameroon's National Institute of Youth and Sports. he took up athletics in 2014 and represented Cameroon in three jumping events at both the 2015 and 2017 Summer Universiade. He placed tenth in the long and triple jump finals in 2017. At the Islamic Solidarity Games that year he was tenth in long jump and eleventh in triple jump. He also managed fifth in the long jump at the 2017 Jeux de la Francophonie.

International competitions

References

External links

Living people
1990 births
People from Ebolowa
Cameroonian male triple jumpers
Commonwealth Games bronze medallists for Cameroon
Commonwealth Games medallists in athletics
Athletes (track and field) at the 2018 Commonwealth Games
Athletes (track and field) at the 2019 African Games
Competitors at the 2015 Summer Universiade
Competitors at the 2017 Summer Universiade
African Games competitors for Cameroon
Medallists at the 2018 Commonwealth Games